Ling Tai is a Chinese actress, remembered for being a presenter on the final year of children's programme Crackerjack! as well as playing Lily in the first series of children's comedy Spatz.

Early life 

In 1960, she was found abandoned as a baby on the streets of Hong Kong. Rescued by a policeman, she was taken to an orphanage. Aged six months, the girl was brought to Britain with nine other babies, where she was adopted by a couple from Eastcote. Aged 18, Ling planned to return home to China with her adoptive parents but decided to enter the world of acting.

Acting career 

Acting work includes appearances in The Two Ronnies, Bergerac, Dramarama, Never the Twain, Alas Smith and Jones, Coronation Street and Soldier Soldier. Doctor Who fans recall Ling for her part as Shou Yuing in the 1989 story Battlefield (after previously being an uncredited extra in The Leisure Hive and Warriors of the Deep).

On stage, the actress has appeared as the Princess in two pantomime productions of Aladdin: firstly in 1984 at the Darlington Civic Theatre (starring Iris Williams) and then in 1985 at the Theatre Royal, Brighton (starring Christopher Biggins). Other work includes South Pacific at Connaught Theatre, Worthing in 1983 and in Alex Finlayson's Winding the Bell at the Royal Exchange, Manchester in 1989, as well as various Crackerjack productions.

Her last known acting role was in the 2006 film The Missing Star.

References

External links 
 

Living people
Chinese television actresses
Chinese emigrants to the United Kingdom
Child abandonment
Date of birth missing (living people)
Year of birth missing (living people)